Hinterseer is a surname. Notable people with the surname include:

Ernst Hinterseer (born 1932), Austrian alpine skier
Guido Hinterseer (born 1964), Austrian alpine skier
Hansi Hinterseer (born 1954), Austrian singer, actor, and alpine skier
Lukas Hinterseer (born 1991), Austrian footballer

German-language surnames